The Soyuz-TMA is a revision of the Soyuz spacecraft, superseded in 2010 by the Soyuz TMA-M. 
(T – транспортный – Transportnyi – meaning transport, M – модифицированный – Modifitsirovannyi – meaning modified, A – антропометрический, – Antropometricheskii meaning anthropometric). 
It is used by the Russian Federal Space Agency for human spaceflight. The spacecraft features several changes to accommodate requirements requested by NASA in order to service the International Space Station, including more latitude in the height and weight of the crew and improved parachute systems. It is also the first expendable vehicle to feature a "glass cockpit". Soyuz-TMA looks identical to the earlier Soyuz-TM spacecraft on the outside, but interior differences allow it to accommodate taller occupants with new adjustable crew couches.

Design 

A Soyuz spacecraft consists of three parts (from front to back):

 A spheroid orbital module
 A small aerodynamic reentry module
 A cylindrical service module with solar panels attached

The first two portions are habitable living space. By moving as much as possible into the orbital module, which does not have to be shielded or decelerated during atmospheric re-entry, the Soyuz three-part craft is both larger and lighter than the two-part Apollo spacecraft's command module. The Apollo command module had six cubic meters of living space and a mass of 5000 kg; the three-part Soyuz provided the same crew with nine cubic meters of living space, an airlock, and a service module for the mass of the Apollo capsule alone. This does not consider the orbital module, that could be used instead of the Apollo Lunar Module.

Soyuz can carry up to three cosmonauts and provide life support for them for about 30 person days. The life support system provides a nitrogen/oxygen atmosphere at sea level partial pressures. The atmosphere is regenerated through KO2 cylinders, which absorb most of the CO2 and water produced by the crew and regenerates the oxygen, and LiOH cylinders which absorb leftover CO2.

The vehicle is protected during launch by a nose fairing, which is jettisoned after passing through the atmosphere. It has an automatic docking system. The ship can be operated automatically, or by a pilot independently of ground control.

Orbital Module (BO) 

The forepart of the spacecraft is the orbital module (: бытовой отсек (BO), Bitovoy otsek) also known as Habitation section. It houses all the equipment that will not be needed for reentry, such as experiments, cameras or cargo. Commonly, it is used as both eating area and lavatory. At its far end, it also contains the docking port. This module also contains a toilet, docking avionics and communications gear. On the latest Soyuz versions, a small window was introduced, providing the crew with a forward view.

A hatch between it and the descent module can be closed so as to isolate it to act as an airlock if needed, cosmonauts exiting through its side port (at the bottom of this picture, near the descent module) on the launch pad, they have entered the spacecraft through this port.

This separation also lets the orbital module be customized to the mission with less risk to the life-critical descent module. The convention of orientation in zero gravity differs from that of the descent module, as cosmonauts stand or sit with their heads to the docking port.

Reentry Module (SA) 

The reentry module (: спускаемый аппарат (СА), Spuskaemiy apparat (SA)) is used for launch and the journey back to Earth. It is covered by a heat-resistant covering to protect it during re-entry. It is slowed initially by the atmosphere, then by a braking parachute, followed by the main parachute which slows the craft for landing. At one meter above the ground, solid-fuel braking engines mounted behind the heat shield are fired to give a soft landing. One of the design requirements for the reentry module was for it to have the highest possible volumetric efficiency (internal volume divided by hull area). The best shape for this is a sphere, but such a shape can provide no lift, which results in a purely ballistic reentry. Ballistic reentries are hard on the occupants due to high deceleration and can't be steered beyond their initial deorbit burn. That is why it was decided to go with the "headlight" shape that the Soyuz uses — a hemispherical forward area joined by a barely angled conical section (seven degrees) to a classic spherical section heat shield. This shape allows a small amount of lift to be generated due to the unequal weight distribution. The nickname was coined at a time when nearly every automobile headlight was a circular paraboloid.

Service Module (PAO) 

At the back of the vehicle is the service module (: приборно-агрегатный отсек, Priborno-Agregatniy Otsek (PAO)). It has an instrumentation compartment (: приборный отсек, Priborniy Otsek (PO)), a pressurized container shaped like a bulging can that contains systems for temperature control, electric power supply, long-range radio communications, radio telemetry, and instruments for orientation and control. The propulsion compartment (: агрегатный отсек, Agregatniy Otsek (AO)), a non-pressurized part of the service module, contains the main engine and a spare: liquid-fuel propulsion systems for maneuvering in orbit and initiating the descent back to Earth. The ship also has a system of low-thrust engines for orientation, attached to the intermediate compartment (: переходной отсек, Perekhodnoi Otsek (PkhO)). Outside the service module are the sensors for the orientation system and the solar array, which is oriented towards the sun by rotating the ship.

Re-entry procedure 

Because its modular construction differs from that of previous designs, the Soyuz has an unusual sequence of events prior to re-entry. The spacecraft is turned engine-forward and the main engine is fired for de-orbiting fully 180° ahead of its planned landing site. This requires the least propellant for re-entry, the spacecraft traveling on an elliptical Hohmann orbit to a point where it will be low enough in the atmosphere to re-enter.

Early Soyuz spacecraft would then have the service and orbital modules detach simultaneously. As they are connected by tubing and electrical cables to the descent module, this would aid in their separation and avoid having the descent module alter its orientation. Later Soyuz spacecraft detach the orbital module before firing the main engine, which saves even more propellant, enabling the descent module to return more payload. In no case can the orbital module remain in orbit as an addition to a space station, for the hatch enabling it to function as an airlock is part of the descent module.

Re-entry firing is typically done on the "dawn" side of the Earth, so that the spacecraft can be seen by recovery helicopters as it descends in the evening twilight, illuminated by the sun when it is above the shadow of the Earth. Since the beginning of Soyuz missions to the ISS, only five have performed nighttime landings.

Spacecraft systems 

 Thermal Control System – Sistema Obespecheniya Teplovogo Rezhima, SOTR  - Cистема Обеспечения Теплового Режима, COTP
 Life support system – Kompleks Sredstv Obespecheniya Zhiznideyatelnosti, KSOZh - Комплекс Средств Обеспечения Жизнедеятельности, KCOЖ
 Power Supply System – Sistema Elektropitaniya, SEP - Система Электропитания, CЭП
 Communication and Tracking Systems – Rassvet (Dawn) radio communications system, Onboard Measurement System (SBI), Kvant-V spacecraft control, Klyost-M television system, Orbit Radio Tracking (RKO)
 Onboard Complex Control System – Sistema Upravleniya Bortovym Kompleksom, SUBK  - Система Управления Бортовым Комплексом, СУБК
 Combined Propulsion System – Kompleksnaya Dvigatelnaya Ustanovka, KDU - Комплексная Двигательная Установка, КДУ
 Chaika-3 Motion Control System – Sistema Upravleniya Dvizheniem, SUD - Cистема Управления Движением, СУД
 Optical/Visual Devices (OVP)- VSK-4 (Vizir Spetsialniy Kosmicheskiy-4 - Визир Специальный Космический-4 ),Night Vision Device (VNUK-K, Visir Nochnogo Upravleniya po Kursu - ВНУK-К, Визир Ночного Управления по Курсу), Docking light, Pilot's Sight (VP-1, Vizir Pilota-1 - ВП-1, Визир Пилота-1), Laser Range Finder (LPR-1, Lazerniy Dalnomer-1 - ЛПР-1, Лазерный Дальномер-1)
 Kurs rendezvous system
 Docking System – Sistema Stykovki i Vnutrennego Perekhoda, SSVP -  Система Стыковки и Внутреннего Перехода, ССВП
 Teleoperator Control Mode – Teleoperatorniy Rezhim Upravleniya, TORU - Телеоператорный Режим Управления, ТОРУ
 Entry Actuators System – Sistema Ispolnitelnikh Organov Spuska, SIO-S - Система Исполнительных Органов Спуска, СИО-С
 Landing Aids Kit – Kompleks Sredstv Prizemleniya, KSP - Комплекс Средств Приземления, КСП
 Portable Survival Kit – Nosimiy Avariyniy Zapas, NAZ  - Носимый Аварийный Запас, НАЗ
 Soyuz launch escape system – Sistema Avariynogo Spaseniya, SAS - Система Аварийного Спасения, САС

Soyuz TMA-M 

The final planned flight of the baseline Soyuz-TMA design was Soyuz TMA-22, launched November 14, 2011 from the Baikonur Cosmodrome's Gagarin's Start launch pad in Kazakhstan, at 04:14:03 UTC. The new modernized Soyuz TMA-M series was developed and built by RKK Energia as an upgrade of the baseline Soyuz-TMA. Thirty-six obsolete pieces of equipment have been replaced with 19 new-generation devices and the vehicle's total mass has been reduced by 70 kilograms (154 lbs). Power consumption has been reduced throughout the ship. There are also changes to the spacecraft's structure, such as replacing the magnesium alloy used in the instrument module frame with aluminium alloy, to make the ship easier to manufacture.

The modernized Soyuz will also enable engineers to test new equipment which may also be used in Russia's next generation crewed space ship that is currently under development.

NASA astronaut Scott Kelly, part of Soyuz TMA-01M's crew, praised the ship's new displays, saying that they make flying easier and less operator intensive.

Two flight development flights were launched: Soyuz TMA-01M on Oct 7, 2010 and Soyuz TMA-02M on Jun 7, 2011. The third ship, Soyuz TMA-03M, launched on 21 December 2011 and was used for qualification tests. In addition to verifying the nominal operation of the spaceship, the testing included verification of off-nominal modes, such as manual attitude control, issuing of orbital maneuvering pulses using four berthing and attitude thrusters, and flying around the ISS in manual control mode.

The TMA-M variant flew 20 missions at a cadence of four times a year before being replaced in 2016 by the Soyuz MS. For the launch schedule, see List of Russian human spaceflight missions.

References

External links 

 Mir Hardware Heritage
 David S.F. Portree, Mir Hardware Heritage, NASA RP-1357, 1995
 Mir Hardware Heritage (wikisource)

 OMWorld's ASTP Docking Trainer Page
 NASA – Russian Soyuz TMA Spacecraft Details
 Space Adventures circum-lunar mission – details
 www.russianspaceweb.com – The Soyuz spacecraft

Crewed spacecraft
Soyuz program
Vehicles introduced in 2002